In mathematics, the Higman group, introduced by , was the first example of an infinite finitely presented group with no non-trivial finite quotients. 
The quotient by the maximal proper normal subgroup is a finitely generated infinite simple group.  later found some finitely presented infinite  groups  that are simple if  is even and have a simple subgroup of index 2 if  is odd, one of which is one of the Thompson groups.

Higman's group is generated by 4 elements  with the relations

References

Group theory